Fire Creek, Firecreek and Fires Creek may refer to:

Fire Creek (2006 film)
Firecreek, a 1968 film
Fires Creek,  a recreational area in North Carolina
Fire Creek (Montana), a stream in Flathead County, Montana
Fire Creek, West Virginia, an unincorporated community in Fayette County